PNML may refer to:
PetName Markup Language, XML proposal for using Petname systems
Petri Net Markup Language